La Energía de Sonric'slandia is a Mexican 60-minute "action-sports" game show for kids that aired for one season on Televisa's Canal 5. It was created to promote healthy habits for children. The show also featured interviews with famous athletes, comedy sketches and live musical performances by various artists.

Gameplay
Six children competed in three sports events for points. The events were based on skills in popular sports, such as basketball, baseball, American football and soccer.

Guest stars

 Miguel Galván, comedian
 Omar Chaparro, comedian
 Christopher Uckermann, actor and singer
 Anahí, actress and singer
 Dulce María, actress and singer
 Maite Perroni, actress and singer
 Christian Chávez, actor and singer
 Alfonso Herrera, actor and singer

External links
 Press release on Esmas, Televisa's official website
 Article on Esmas
 Sonric's Official Website
 

Canal 5 (Mexico) original programming
Mexican game shows